Gilbert Owen Nations (1866–1950) was an American lawyer and judge from Washington, D.C. who campaigned against Roman Catholicism in the United States. In 1924, he was the presidential nominee of an organization called the American Party. He was also a professor of Roman and Papal law at American University in Washington, D.C.

He began practicing law in Missouri in 1902. Nations served as a probate judge in St. Francois County, Missouri. He moved to Washington D.C. in 1916.

His publications include Constitution or Pope? Why Alien Roman Catholics can not be Legally Naturalized (1915); Papal Sovereignty, the Government within our Government (1917); Papal Guilt of the World War Washington, D.C.: The Protestant (1921); and The Canon Law of the Papal Throne (1926). He also published a periodical called The Protestant from an office in Washington; and published other periodicals called The Menace and The Fellowship Forum.

He died in 1950 in Park Ridge, Illinois.

References 

1866 births
1950 deaths
Missouri state court judges
County judges in the United States
Lawyers from Washington, D.C.
Critics of the Catholic Church
American University faculty and staff
Candidates in the 1924 United States presidential election
Writers from Washington, D.C.
Far-right politics in the United States
Anti-Catholicism in the United States